Verschaffeltiinae is a subtribe of plants in the family Arecaceae endemic to the Seychelles.

Genera in the subtribe, all of which are monotypic, are:
Nephrosperma
Phoenicophorium
Roscheria
Verschaffeltia

References

 
Arecaceae subtribes